Robert Frank (born 22 January 1990, Sandringham) is an Australian table tennis player. He competed for Australia at the 2012 Summer Olympics in the men's team event.

References

1990 births
Living people
Table tennis players at the 2012 Summer Olympics
Olympic table tennis players of Australia
Australian male table tennis players
Sportspeople from Melbourne